Mark Marnell (1926 - 9 July 1992) was an Irish hurler who played as a left corner-back for the Kilkenny senior team.

Born in Oldtown, Danesfort, County Kilkenny, Marnell first arrived on the inter-county scene when he first linked up with the Kilkenny senior team, making his debut in the 1947 championship. Marnell was a regular member of the team over the next few years. During that time he won one All-Ireland medal and three Leinster medals. He was an All-Ireland runner-up on one occasion.

Marnell also represented the Leinster inter-provincial team, however, he never won a Railway Cup medal. At club level he won one championship medal with Tullaroan.

Honours

Team

Tullaroan
Kilkenny Senior Hurling Championship (1): 1948

Kilkenny
All-Ireland Senior Hurling Championship (1): 1947
Leinster Senior Hurling Championship (3): 1947, 1950, 1953

References

1926 births
1992 deaths
Danesfort hurlers
Tullaroan hurlers
Kilkenny inter-county hurlers
Leinster inter-provincial hurlers
All-Ireland Senior Hurling Championship winners